The Ohio Rural Intercity Bus Program, branded as GoBus, is a fixed-route intercity bus service operating in the U.S. state of Ohio with funding from the Ohio Department of Transportation. It connects Athens, Ohio and Ohio University to Columbus, Ohio, Cincinnati, Ohio, Cleveland, Ohio, and other cities. GoBus is administered by Hocking-Athens-Perry Community Action Programs (HAPCAP) under its transportation division.

Routes 
It operates with 56 passenger motor coaches with amenities including free wireless internet, outlets at every seat, an on-board restroom, and seat belts at every seat. GoBus is one of several services connecting rural areas and urban centers by coordinating services with Greyhound Lines, Barons Bus Lines, Miller Transportation, John Glenn Columbus International Airport, and other national and local transportation services.

As of January 1, 2023, GoBus is operated solely by Barons Bus.

Cities served 

 Akron, Ohio
 Albany, Ohio
 Athens, Ohio; Ohio University
 Batavia, Ohio
 Broadview Heights, Ohio
 Caldwell, Ohio
 Cambridge, Ohio
 Canton, Ohio
 Cincinnati, Ohio; University of Cincinnati
 Cleveland, Ohio
 Columbus, Ohio: Columbus Bus Station
 Coolville, Ohio
 Delphos, Ohio
 Jackson, Ohio
 Kenton, Ohio
 Lancaster, Ohio
 Lima, Ohio
 Logan, Ohio
 Marietta, Ohio
 Marysville, Ohio
 Mount Eaton, Ohio
 Nelsonville, Ohio; Hocking College
 Newcomerstown, Ohio
 New Philadelphia, Ohio
 Parkersburg, West Virginia
 Parma, Ohio
 Peebles, Ohio
 Seaman, Ohio
 Van Wert, Ohio
 Wooster, Ohio; The College of Wooster

References

External links 
 Official website
 ODOT page
 2015 Route Expansion 
 

Bus transportation in Ohio
Intercity bus companies of the United States
2010 establishments in Ohio
Transportation companies based in Ohio